The Blackout is the debut studio album by American Christian hip hop artist Derek Minor (at the time went under PRo), released on October 31, 2008 through his label Reflection Music Group (at the time named Christ Like Entertainment). The album was noted for its "braggadocios" approach. The song "Hate Me More", featuring Kingstone, was released as a promotional single through the Christian hip hop website DaSouth.com.

Track listing

References 

Derek Minor albums
2008 debut albums